Linda Yeomans (born 18 August 1951) is a Guamanian windsurfer. She competed in the women's Lechner A-390 event at the 1992 Summer Olympics.

References

External links
 
 

1951 births
Living people
Guamanian windsurfers
Female windsurfers
Guamanian female sailors (sport)
Olympic sailors of Guam
Sailors at the 1992 Summer Olympics – Lechner A-390
Place of birth missing (living people)
21st-century American women